Tu Hi Re is a 2015 romantic drama Marathi language film directed by Sanjay Jadhav and stars Swwapnil Joshi, Sai Tamhankar and Tejaswini Pandit in the leading roles. This is the third film by trio of Sanjay Jadhav, Swwapnil Joshi and Sai Tamhankar after Duniyadari and Pyaar Vali Love Story. It is an official remake of the 2006 Tamil film Sillunu Oru Kaadhal starring Jyothika, Suriya and Bhumika.

For this movie Sai Tamhankar and Tejaswini Pandit have first time recorded a song as a playback singers. For the promotion of the movie Tu Hi Re Swwapnil Joshi, Sai Tamhankar and Tejaswini Pandit  have appeared in Popular Marathi TV Series Dil Dosti Duniyadari.

Plot
Nandini (Sai Tamhankar) is someone who is a staunch believer in love marriages but following her father's orders, she marries Siddharth (Swwapnil Joshi) who is coping with heartbreak. Eight years later, Siddharth and Nandini are leading happy lives in Mumbai with their daughter. Kamlakar Bhanushali (Girish Oak), a politician who has some connection with Siddharth's past, comes to Siddharth's workplace and makes a proposal to him. He tells Siddharth that he's ready to fund Siddharth's work plant with Rs 25 crore provided he gets rid of Nandini. Turns out, Siddharth used to be in a relationship with Bhanushali's daughter Bhairavi (Tejaswini Pandit). How this situation resolves forms the crux of the story.

Cast
 Swapnil Joshi as Siddharth 
 Sai Tamhankar as Nandini
 Tejaswini Pandit as Bhairavi Bhanushali
 Girish Oak as MP Kamlakar Bhanushali, Bhairavi's father
 Sushant Shelar as Prasad

Soundtrack

Guru Thakur, Mandar Cholkar and Kunthinath Karke wrote lyrics for the film's soundtrack. Amitraj, Pankaj Padghan and Shashank Powar composed the score.

Track listing

Reception
The film has received positive reviews. Pune Mirror, the Times Of India, and the Maharashtra Times have all given the film a 3-star review.

References

External links
 
 
 

2015 films
Indian romantic drama films
Marathi remakes of Tamil films
2010s Marathi-language films
2015 romantic drama films
Films directed by Sanjay Jadhav